UPLA may refer to:

Education:
Los Andes Peruvian University, a university in Peru
Universidad de Playa Ancha, a university in Chile

Political parties:
 Union of Latin American Parties, an organisation for centre-right political parties in Latin America
 Party of the United Struggle for Africans in Angola